The Rančić family house is located in Grocka, at 9 Majevička Street, in the immediate vicinity of the Čaršija in Grocka, on the elevated spacious plot, set free in relation with the street regulation. The House was built in the beginning of the House, as the two-part Kosovo style ground-floor house, built in half-timbered construction filled with wattle and daub, and covered with four-sided ceramide (a type of roof tiles) roof with large roof drains – eaves. Along the entire front facade there was a very deep architraved porch levelled with the terrain. There was a special door leading from the porch into the „house“, that is, the room, while the internal communication between the „house“ and the room was left out. The rooms in the house were separated, not mutually connected, so later on, the house was rebuilt. It was elevated then so that it got a basement and a veranda, which gave it the appearance of the town house. The present organization of the rooms was done around the heart room, as the central room directly connected to the porch.

The architecture

In the middle of the 19th century, changes were done in the design construction for, which dominated in the village in the 1830s and as a result so-called Grocka town houses appeared, so Rančić family house also belonged to this group of houses. The basis is widened and the house got larger dimensions and new organization of space. As most of such houses in Grocka, Rančić family house after the change consisted of four rooms of a strictly defined purpose: heart room, living room, two bedrooms, basement and a porch, which on the corner enlarges into the veranda.  The house was built in half-timbered construction, with the frame built out of the oak beams filled with wattle and daub or adobe. The foundations are built from the stone and oak beams. The roof is low, four-sided and covered in ceramide. The roof drains which protect the facade reach one metre in width. In the inside of the house, on the porch and on the veranda, the floors are paved with bricks or wooden boards. Although peculiar, first of all in the arrangements and purpose of the rooms, the town house in Grocka, that is, Rančić family house, is not isolated, but it is connected to the same house type as in towns in Podunavlje and Pomoravlje. Similarities between Grocka town houses and those in other towns in Podunavlje  (Smederevo, Dobra, Golubac) can be associated with the common natural and social factors which existed in this area. From the aspect of architectural and ethnographic values, Rančić family house represents a rarely saved example of the folk construction in the area around the City of Belgrade, whose characteristics represent the great achievement of construction, residential and artistic culture.

Conservation works

Conservation and restoration works were conducted for the first time in 1970, after which the Rančić family house became the Native Land Museum  where Dubočajska collection of dr Коstić. During  2000 the sanitation of the damage was done and the surrounding area was decorated
The cultural centre of the Municipality of Grocka is now placed in Rančić family house.

The cultural monument 

The Rančić family house has had the status of the cultural monument  of great importance since 1966.

See also

Spisak spomenika kulture u Beogradu

References

External links 

Republički zavod za zaštitu spomenika kulture – Beograd 
Lista spomenika 
Grocka: Zaštićene kuće u kojima nema nijedan ekser („Večernje novine“, 1. mart 2014) 

Houses in Serbia
Buildings and structures in Belgrade
Cultural Monuments of Great Importance (Serbia)
Grocka